A kumiho or gumiho (literally "nine-tailed fox") is a creature that appears in the folktales on East Asia and legends of Korea. It is similar to the Chinese  and the Japanese . It can freely transform, among other things, into a beautiful woman often set out to seduce boys, and eat their liver or heart (depending on the legend). There are numerous tales in which the  appears, several of which can be found in the encyclopedic Compendium of Korean Oral Literature.

Mythology

The old Chinese text Classic of Mountains and Seas, the earliest record to document the nine-tailed fox, mentioned that the fox with nine tails came from and lived in the country called Qingqiu (靑丘) three hundreds miles east, the term meaning "green hill" interpreted as the country or region of the east and was later historically used to refer to the region of Korea at least since the era during the Three Kingdoms of Korea. However, the name of Gojoseon (called Joseon in the record), the Korean kingdom that existed along with other minor states of the Korean peninsula at the time, was separately introduced in the same record.

Kumiho and other versions of the nine-tailed fox myths and folklores share a similar concept. All explain fox spirits as being the result of great longevity or the accumulation of energy, said to be foxes who have lived for a thousand years, and give them the power of shapeshifting, usually appearing in the guise of a woman. However, while China's huli jing and Japan's kitsune are often depicted as either good, evil or neutral, the kumiho is almost always treated as a malignant figure who feasts on human flesh. It is unclear at which point in time Koreans began viewing the kumiho as a purely evil creature, since many ancient texts  mention the benevolent kumiho assisting humans (and even make mentions of wicked humans tricking kind but naïve kumiho).

In later literature, kumiho were often depicted as bloodthirsty half-fox, half-human creatures that wandered cemeteries at night, digging human hearts out from graves. The fairy tale The Fox Sister depicts a fox spirit preying on a family for their livers.

The most distinctive feature that separates the kumiho from its two counterparts (Japanese kitsune, and Chinese huli jing) is the existence of a 'yeowoo guseul' (여우구슬, literally meaning fox marble/bead) which is said to consist of knowledge. According to Korean mythology, the yeowoo guseul provides power to the kumiho and knowledge (and intelligence) to people if they can steal and swallow one. The kumiho can absorb humans' energy with it. The method of absorbing energy with the "yeowoo guseul" resembles a "deep kiss" (i.e. a kiss using a tongue). The kumiho sends the yeowoo guseul into people's mouths and then retakes it with their tongues. If that person swallows the yeowoo guseul, however, and then observes "sky, land, and people", each observation gives the observer preternatural knowledge. But the person fails to watch the "sky" in most tales, so they get a special ability but not the most important one.

Most legends state that while a gumiho was capable of changing its appearance, there is still something persistently fox-like about it  (i.e. a foxy face, a set of ears, or the tell-tale nine tails) or a magical way of forcing; its countenance changes, but its nature does not. In Transformation of the Kumiho (구미호의 변신), a kumiho transforms into the identical likeness of a bride at a wedding and is only discovered when her clothes are removed. Bakh Mun-su and the Kumiho (박문수와 구미호) records an encounter that Pak Munsu has with a girl, living alone in the woods, that has a foxy appearance. In The Maiden who Discovered a Kumiho through a Chinese Poem (한시로 구미호를 알아낸 처녀), the kumiho is ultimately revealed when a hunting dog catches the scent of a fox and attacks. Although they have the ability to change forms, the true identity of a kumiho was said to be zealously guarded by the kumiho themselves. Some tales say that if a kumiho abstains from killing and eating humans for a thousand days, it can become human.

Much like changelings, werewolves or vampires in Western lore, there are always variations on the myth depending on the liberties that each story takes with the legend. One version of the mythology, however, holds that with enough will, a kumiho could further ascend from its yogoe (spirit) state, become permanently human and lose its evil character. Explanations of how this could be achieved vary, but sometimes include aspects such as refraining from killing or tasting meat for a thousand days, or obtaining a cintamani and making sure that the Yeoiju saw the full moon at least every month during the ordeal. Unlike Yeoiju-wielding dragons, kumiho were not thought to be capable of omnipotence or creation at will, since they were lesser creatures.

See also

 Fox spirit, a general overview about this being in East Asian mythology
 Huli jing – a Chinese fox spirit
 Kitsune – a Japanese fox spirit
Tamamo-no-Mae - a famous nine-tailed fox spirit in Japanese folklore
 Hồ ly tinh - a Vietnamese fox spirit
 Korean fox
 Ungnyeo, a bear-woman in Korean mythology

References

External links
 Kumiho: The Korean fox
 Monster of the Week: Kumiho

Female legendary creatures
Korean legendary creatures
Mythological foxes